The Ouddeelsmolen,  Lytse Geast or Swarte Prinsch (Black Prince) is a smock mill in Tytsjerk, Friesland, Netherlands which was built in 1900 and has been converted to a holiday cottage. Restored so that it can turn in the wind, it is listed as a Rijksmonument.

History
A mill was built on this site in 1832. The Ouddeelsmolen was built in 1900 by millwrights Sipke Jelles and Jelle Sipkes Lenstra of Wolvega, Friesland. It was built to drain the Ouddeel polder. It worked until 1963, latterly with Patent sails. Now converted to holiday accommodation, it was restored in 1994 by Aannemingsbedrijf Thijs Jellema of Burdaard, Friesland. New sails were fitted. It is listed as a Rijksmonument, №35688.

Description

The Ouddeelsmolen is what the Dutch describe as a Grondzeiler. It is a one storey smock mill on a single storey base. There is no stage, the sails reaching almost to ground level. The mill is winded by tailpole and winch. The smock and cap are thatched. The sails are Common sails. The sails are carried on a cast iron windshaft, which was cast by J M de Muinck Keizer, Martenshoek. Groningen in 1898. The windshaft carries the brake wheel which has 44 cogs. The mill formerly drove an Archimedes' screw.

Operators
Pieter Willems de Boer (1900–24)
Mhr. Tiemersma (1924– )
Mhr. Adema ( -1963)

References for above:-

References

Windmills in Friesland
Windmills completed in 1900
Smock mills in the Netherlands
Windpumps in the Netherlands
Agricultural buildings in the Netherlands
Rijksmonuments in Friesland
Octagonal buildings in the Netherlands